"Lord I Just Can't Keep From Crying" is a traditional gospel blues song recorded in 1928 by Blind Willie Johnson (vocals and guitar) and Willie B. Harris (vocals), who is thought to have been his first wife. Some versions of the song recorded by other artists have slightly different titles: for example, a comma after "Lord"; or, "Cryin'" instead of "Crying"; or, an appended "Sometime" or "Sometimes".

Recordings 

 192627Rev. H. R. Tomlin 
 1966The Blues Project, on the album Projections, titled "I Can't Keep from Crying"
 1967Brother Joe May, on the album Thank You Lord for One More Day 
 1994 or beforeLaura Henton 
 1997 or beforeGolden Gate Quartet
 1998Phoebe Snow, on the album I Can't Complain
 2004 or beforeBessie Johnson Sanctified Singers, on the compilation album Goodbye, Babylon 
 2011The Barr Brothers, on the album The Barr Brothers
 2011Colin Stetson, on the album New History Warfare Vol. 2: Judges
 2011Dave "Snaker" Ray, on the album My Blue Heaven

References 

Blind Willie Johnson songs
Year of song unknown
Blues songs
Gospel songs
Songwriter unknown